Sierra Unified School District  is a public school district based in Fresno County, California, United States.

External links
 

School districts in Fresno County, California
1923 establishments in California
School districts established in 1923